Guillecrinidae is a small family of echinoderms in the class Crinoidea, and contains the following genera and species below.

Genera and species
 Guillecrinus Roux, 1985
 Guillecrinus neocaledonicus Bourseau et al., 1991
 Guillecrinus reunionensis Roux, 1985
 Vityazicrinus Mironov & Sorokina, 1998
 Vityazicrinus petrachenkoi Mironov & Sorokina, 1998

References

Echinoderm families
Comatulida